An Innocent Affair is a 1948 American comedy film directed by Lloyd Bacon and written by Lou Breslow and Joseph Hoffman. The film stars Fred MacMurray, Madeleine Carroll, Charles "Buddy" Rogers, Rita Johnson, Louise Allbritton and Alan Mowbray. It was released on October 15, 1948 by United Artists. In the United Kingdom, the film was released under the title Don't Trust Your Husband.

Plot

Advertising man Vincent Doane is assigned to land Margot Fraser's perfume account. Anxious that his wife Paula might become jealous, he tells her that the account is with a Mr. Fraser.

Paula becomes suspicious and plays a trick on Vincent. She hires an actor to pretend to be a gigolo who is interested in her, but she does not know that Vincent knows about the ruse. Business tycoon Claude Kimball is mistaken for the gigolo and is ensnared in the Doanes' schemes.

Vincent is shocked when Claude arranges for a multimillion-dollar tobacco account to come his way. Paula demands a divorce during the confusion, convinced that Vincent has been having an affair with Margot. At a train station, Margot slaps Paula, who finally realizes that her husband has been faithful to her all along.

Cast 
Fred MacMurray as Vincent Doane
Madeleine Carroll as Paula Doane
Charles "Buddy" Rogers as Claude Kimball
Rita Johnson as Eve Lawrence
Louise Allbritton as Margot Fraser
Alan Mowbray as Ken St. Clair
Michael Romanoff as Venetian Room Maître d'hôtel
Pierre Watkin as T.D. Hendricks
William Tannen as Gaylord
James Seay as Lester Burnley
Matt McHugh as Ted Burke
Marie Blake as Hilda
Susan Miller as Venetian Room Vocalist
Anne Nagel as Gladys
Eddie Le Baron as Venetian Room Orchestra Leader
Jane Weeks as Dori

Production 
Fred MacMurray bought the story from writers Lou Breslow and Joseph Hoffman and then sold it to Nasser Productions for $75,000, returning him a large profit. MacMurray was paid more than $150,000 for his role in the film and also received a percentage of its profits.

Norma Shearer and Myrna Loy were considered for the role of Paula Doane.

Nasser Productions made a lucrative offer to Italian conductor Arturo Toscanini to compose the film's music but eventually hired Hans J. Salter. Buddy Rogers received ballroom dance lessons from Arthur Murray for the film.

Filming was delayed by the late arrival of Madeleine Carroll but began on March 15, 1948.

After positive preview screenings, producer James Nasser purchased another comedy script written by Breslow and Hoffman titled You Made Me Love You for $100,000. Nasser intended the project as a sequel of sorts to An Innocent Affair, with director Lloyd Bacon, Rogers, MacMurray and Carroll returning, but the film did not materialize.

Reception 
In a contemporary review for The New York Times, critic Thomas M. Pryor wrote: "Perhaps the writers didn't try hard enough, or perhaps this picture represents their level best, but, in any case, the truth of the matter is that the merriment is spread rather thin and unevenly. 'Bounce' is what this farcical excursion lacks."

References

External links
 

1948 films
American black-and-white films
United Artists films
1948 comedy films
American comedy films
Films directed by Lloyd Bacon
Films scored by Hans J. Salter
1940s English-language films
1940s American films